Raymond George Lumpp (July 11, 1923 – January 16, 2015) was an American professional basketball player.

Lumpp was born in Brooklyn and grew up in Queens.  He played college basketball for New York University, and was on the team that made it to the finals of the 1948 NIT tournament. Lumpp competed in the 1948 Summer Olympics as part of the American men's basketball team that won the gold medal. From 1948 to 1953 Lumpp played professionally for the NBA's New York Knicks, Indianapolis Jets, and Baltimore Bullets.  He averaged 12.7 points per game in his rookie season.

Following his basketball career, Lumpp served as athletic director of the New York Athletic Club and ran the club’s annual track and field meet during the 1960s.  He later organized the Vitalis Olympic Invitational indoor meet held at the Meadowlands. He died in Mineola, New York in January 2015.

BAA/NBA career statistics

Regular season

Playoffs

References

External links
Olympic profile
Professional statistics

1923 births
2015 deaths
American men's basketball players
Baltimore Bullets (1944–1954) players
Basketball players at the 1948 Summer Olympics
Burials at Locust Valley Cemetery
Indianapolis Jets draft picks
Indianapolis Jets players
Medalists at the 1948 Summer Olympics
Basketball players from New York City
New York Knicks players
NYU Violets men's basketball players
Olympic gold medalists for the United States in basketball
Point guards
Shooting guards
Sportspeople from Brooklyn
United States men's national basketball team players